Concert for George is a live tribute soundtrack album in honour of George Harrison, recorded on the first anniversary of his death, and issued in 2003 in conjunction with the simultaneous DVD release of the same name. Featuring performances of many of Harrison's best-known songs, played by his closest musician friends, Concert for George is considered a fitting and heartfelt celebration of Harrison's considerable career.

Tribute concert
Recorded at the Royal Albert Hall in London on 29 November 2002 – the first anniversary of Harrison's death – the performance features a wealth of talents who knew Harrison well. Eric Clapton, one of Harrison's closest friends, served as the musical director of the show, which was advertised as the Concert for George. Representing Indian music, an important influence on Harrison's life, is Ravi Shankar and his daughter Anoushka Shankar. Among Harrison's rock and roll cohorts are Jeff Lynne, Gary Brooker, Joe Brown, Tom Petty and the Heartbreakers, Billy Preston and Jim Keltner, together with Harrison's former Beatles bandmates Ringo Starr and Paul McCartney, and his son Dhani.

Before the Indian portion that opened the concert, Ravi Shankar said to the audience: "I strongly feel that George is here tonight. I mean, how can he not be here, when all of us who loved him so much have assembled here to sing for him and play music for him? I'm sure he's here."

Release and reception
Concert for George was issued on 17 November 2003 in Britain, with a US release following on 18 November. A double album, it peaked at number 97 on America's Billboard chart.

Uncut magazine's reviewer wrote: "Concerts like these are usually long on sentiment and short on worthwhile content. But under the directorship of Eric Clapton, the concert for George Harrison at the Albert Hall in November 2002 was an exception. The event exudes a powerful atmosphere and genuine musicality…" Writing in The Word, Paul Du Noyer described the posthumous tribute to Harrison as "the grandest send-off that he could possibly have wished for". Du Noyer said of the live album, "Its sins are only those of omission", and recommended the accompanying DVD release, before concluding: "In either format, however, [Joe Brown's] show-closing 'I’ll See You In My Dreams' is an exquisitely poignant note to end upon".

In 2005, the Concert for George DVD won the Best Long Form Video Grammy. Directed by David Leland, it contains material not found on the album, including "Sit on My Face" and "The Lumberjack Song" by Monty Python, and "Horse to the Water", featuring Jools Holland with vocals by Sam Brown.

iTunes released Concert for George in 2008 with "Horse to the Water" added to the album.

In 2018, Concert for George was released in several packages and formats, including 180-gram vinyl LP records, to celebrate Harrison's 75th birthday. The new vinyl and digital edition included additional tracks not present on both the original and 2018 reissue CD editions: "Sit on My Face" and "The Lumberjack Song" by Monty Python, and "Horse to the Water" by Sam Brown.

Track listing 
All songs written by George Harrison, except where noted.

References

George Harrison tribute albums
Albums produced by Jeff Lynne
George Harrison
Collaborative albums
2003 live albums
Warner Records live albums
2003 video albums
Live video albums
Warner Records video albums
Live albums recorded at the Royal Albert Hall